Kinkel may refer to:

Bob Kinkel, a musician
Gottfried Kinkel (1815–1882), German poet
Johanna Kinkel (1810–1858), German composer, writer, and revolutionary
Kip Kinkel (born 1982), American school shooter
Klaus Kinkel (1936–2019), German politician